Radiměř is a market town in Svitavy District in the Pardubice Region of the Czech Republic. It has about 1,200 inhabitants.

Notable people
Hugo Jury (1887–1945), Austrian Nazi politician

References

Market towns in the Czech Republic
Populated places in Svitavy District